The Independent Herrenian Group (AHI) is a regionalist and Canarian nationalist political party in El Hierro. AHI was created in 1979, and ruled the island until 2019, with the exception of the 1991–1995 and 2011-2015 periods.

The party is generally associated with Canarian Coalition.

Electoral performance

Parliament of the Canary Islands

 * Within Canarian Coalition.

See also
 Canarian nationalism
 El Hierro

References

External links
  Official facebook.

Political parties in the Canary Islands
Political parties established in 1979
Regionalist parties in Spain
1979 establishments in Spain
Canarian nationalist parties
Federalist parties in Spain